The blue-headed crested flycatcher (Trochocercus nitens) is a species of bird in the family Monarchidae, native to the African tropical forest.

Taxonomy and systematics
Formerly, some authorities have placed the blue-headed crested flycatcher in the genus Terpsiphone. Alternate names include the blue-headed flycatcher and blue-headed paradise-flycatcher.

Subspecies
Two subspecies are recognized:
 Upper Guinea blue-headed crested flycatcher (T. n. reichenowi) - Sharpe, 1904: Originally described as a separate species. Found from Guinea to Togo
 T. n. nitens - Cassin, 1859: Found from Nigeria to southern Sudan, Uganda, Democratic Republic of Congo and northwestern Angola

References

blue-headed crested flycatcher
Birds of the African tropical rainforest
blue-headed crested flycatcher
Taxonomy articles created by Polbot